Slovalco is a large Slovak metallurgical company that produced 160,000 tonnes of aluminium and alloys per annum.

In 2022, Slovalco had to release most of its 450 employees due to high energy costs. Instead of concentrating on primary aluminium production, the company re-oriented to remelting with expected annual output of roughly 75,000 tons. In January 2023, the company had shut down the remaining 10 cells ceasing aluminium production in the city after almost 70 years.

History
December 1985 - approval of project by the ČSSR's government in Prague ;
March 1986 - know - how contract signed with Hydro Aluminium and start of construction ;
1987 - carbon plant is finished
1989 - potroom is finished
1989 - last year of financing from state centralized sources 
1992 - construction ceases (65% of project complete) 
April 1993 - negotiation with EBRD 
7 June 1993 - Slovalco is founded 
July 1994 - Slovalco signs a sovereign guaranteed loan agreement with EBRD 
October 1994 - EBRD and Hydro Aluminium become shareholders 
June–December 1995 - the first 172 cells put into operation 
1996 - full operation of electrolysis - 112,000 tons produced 
August 2003 - 54 additional reduction cells put into operation - 226 cells in operation
June 2004 - the millionth tonne of aluminium produced

Ownership
Slovalco is owned 44.7% by a Slovak company called Penta Investments while the remaining 55.3% is owned by Norwegian company Hydro Aluminium part of Norsk Hydro based in Oslo, Norway.

Gallery

References

External links
Home page

Aluminium companies of Slovakia
Aluminium smelters
Slovak brands